Mausoleum Records was a Belgian-based heavy metal label, once considered by Billboard as "one of Europe's premier hard rock labels".

Alfie Falckenbach founded the Mausoleum Records label in 1982 (he also founded the Music Avenue label, and the blues label Blues Boulevard Records). Bands releasing material on the label included Anvil, Faithful Breath, Great White, Killer, L.A. Guns, Nazareth, Omen, Ostrogoth, Ian Gillan Band and Warlock. Celebrating its 30th Anniversary this year, Mausoleum Records was still going strong, and the artist roster consisted of established acts such as Molly Hatchet and Cinderella, in addition to new artists from around the world, including Hyades (Italy), Always Fallen (Belgium), Hills of Kings (Germany), Awaken (USA) and Grenouer (Russia). 

The label folded upon Falckenbach's death in 2016.

Recording artists

References

External links
 
 
 
 Mausoleum Records at Spirit of Metal

Belgian record labels
Heavy metal record labels
Record labels established in 1982
1982 establishments in Belgium